David Grisman's Acoustic Christmas is an album by American musician David Grisman, released in 1983.

Track listing 
 "What Child Is This?" (William Chatterton Dix, Traditional) – 1:01
"Santa Claus Is Coming to Town" (J. Fred Coots, Haven Gillespie) – 3:37
 "Respighi: Ancient Aires and Dances" – 2:32
 "The Christmas Song" (Mel Tormé, Robert Wells) – 4:07
 "God Rest Ye Merry Gentlemen" (Traditional) – 6:51
 "We Wish You a Merry Christmas" (Traditional) – 0:41
 "White Christmas" (Irving Berlin) – 4:16
 "The Flower Carol" (Traditional, Wenchels) – 1:27
 "Winter Wonderland" (Felix Bernard, Richard B. Smith) – 3:44
 "Silent Night" (Josef Mohr, Franz Xaver Gruber) – 3:42
 "Auld Lang Syne" (Burns, Traditional) – 4:04

Personnel
David Grisman – mandolin, mandola
Darol Anger – fiddle, cello, Violectra
Béla Fleck – banjo, 5-string banjo
Mike Marshall – guitar, mandolin, mandola, mandocello
Martin Taylor – guitar
Rob Wasserman – bass
Pamela Abramson – piano
John Stafford – saxophone
Tony Burille – recorder, tenor Crumhorn
Lyn Elder – Hurdygurdy, bass recorder, Crumhorn
Joanna Young – Crumhorn, alto recorder
Bob Gurland – trumpet
Production notes:
David Grisman – producer, mixing
Phil Sawyer – engineer
Bob Shumaker – engineer
Greg Fulginiti – mastering
Gail Evenari – cover design
Craig Miller – production assistant
Jon Sievert – photography

References

1983 Christmas albums
Christmas albums by American artists
David Grisman albums
Jazz Christmas albums